Hit & Run is a greatest hits album by the Canadian rock band Big Sugar, released in 2003.

The album comprises two discs. The first, Hit, compiles the studio versions of the band's singles, along with three previously unreleased songs. The second, Run, is a live concert performance by the band.

Track listing

Hit

Run
 "Goodbye Train / Hammer in My Hand"
 "Skull Ring / Joe Louis / Nashville Grass"
 "I'm a Ram / Rambo"
 "Groundhog Day / Armagideon Time"
 "Where I Stand / In My Time of Dying"

References

Big Sugar albums
2003 live albums
2003 greatest hits albums